The women's sanshou 52 kilograms competition at the 2008 Beijing Wushu Tournament was held from 21 to 24 August at the Olympic Sports Center Gymnasium.

Background 
The top-eight non-Chinese athletes qualified at the 2007 World Wushu Championships. China's Qin Lizi was the 2007 world champion and with her participation in the Beijing Wushu Tournament, the roster ended up with nine competitors. Coincidentally, the results at the tournament were identical with the 2007 world championships, with Qin Lizi being the champion once again.

Schedule 
All times are Beijing Time (UTC+08:00)

Results 
Legend:

TV = Technical victory

References 

Women's_sanshou_52_kg